The 1805 New Hampshire gubernatorial election took place on March 12, 1805. Incumbent Federalist Governor John Taylor Gilman was defeated for re-election by Democratic-Republican candidate, former Governor and U.S. Senator John Langdon in a re-match of the previous year's election.

Results

References 

Gubernatorial
New Hampshire
1805